This is a list of people with surname Warburton.

A
 Adrian Warburton (1918–1944), English RAF Wing Commander
 Albert Warburton (1856–1925), English soccer player
 Alexander Warburton (1852–1929), Canadian politician
 Dame Anne Warburton (born 1927), British diplomat, the first female British ambassador
 Arthur Warburton (1903–1978), English soccer player

B
 Barclay Harding Warburton I (1866–1954), American newspaper publisher
 Barclay Harding Warburton II (1898–1936), American socialite
 Barclay H. Warburton III (1922–1983), founder of the American Sail Training Association
 Ben Warburton (1864–1943), English soccer player
 Bernard Warburton-Lee (1895–1940), Welsh recipient of the Victoria Cross and the Norwegian War Cross

C
 Callum Warburton (born 1989), English soccer player
 Cecil Warburton (1854–1958), English acarologist
 Charles E. Warburton (1837–1896), American publisher
 Charles Warburton (1754–1826), Irish Anglican bishop
 Charlotte Eliot Warburton (1883–1961), New Zealand community leader
 Choppy Warburton (James Edward Warburton) (1845–1897), English athlete and cycling coach
 Clark Warburton (1896–1979), American monetary economist
 Cotton Warburton (1911–1982), American football player
 Curt Warburton (born 1981), English martial artist

D
 David Warburton (born 1965), English politician and businessman
 Derek Warburton  (born 1974), American fashion stylist
 Diana Egerton-Warburton, Australian doctor

E
 Edward Warburton Jones (1912–1993), Northern Irish barrister, judge and politician
 Elizabeth Barbara Warburton-Lytton (1773–1843), member of the Lytton family of Knebworth House
 Elliot Warburton (1810–1852), Irish traveller and writer, whose brother, George Drought Warburton (1816–1857), shared his interests.
 Ernest Warburton (musicologist) (1937–2001), English musicologist
 Ernest K. Warburton (physicist) (1926—1994), American nuclear physicist
 Ernest K. Warburton (US Air Force) U.S. Air Force Brigadier General and test pilot

F
 Fred Warburton (1880–?), English soccer player

G
 Gareth Warburton (born 1982), Welsh middle distance runner
 Gary Warburton (born 1987), Australian rugby footballer
 George Warburton (footballer born 1915) (1915–1996), English professional footballer
 George Warburton (footballer born 1934), Welsh professional footballer
 George Warburton (priest) (fl. 1631–1641), British Dean of Wells

H
 Harry Warburton (1921–2005), Swiss bobsledder
 Helen Warburton, British actress who originally played Vicky McDonald in Coronation Street
 Henry Warburton (1784–1858), English merchant and politician
 Herbert B. Warburton (1916–1983), American lawyer and politician

J
 James Warburton (1855–1928), Canadian physician and politician
 James Warburton (Australian businessman) (1970), Australian businessman and media executive
 Joan Warburton (1920-1996), British artist.
 John Warburton, founding member of The Unbroadcastable Radio Show
 John Warburton (actor) (1899 or 1903–1981), British-American actor
 John Warburton (Baptist) (19th century), leader in the Strict Baptist movement 
 John Warburton (officer of arms) (1682–1759), antiquarian, cartographer, and collector of old manuscripts
 John Warburton (producer) (born 1964), British television producer and director

K
 Keith Warburton (born 1929), Australian rules footballer

L
 Lee Warburton (born 1971), British actor
 Leland S. Warburton (1901–1977), American politician
Lucy Warburton (disambiguation)

M
 Mabel Clarisse Warburton (1879–1961), English Christian missionary and educationalist
 Matt Warburton (born 1978), American television writer
 Morgan Warburton (born 1987), American basketball player

N
 Nev Warburton  (born 1932), Australian politician
 Nick Warburton (born 1947), British writer
 Nigel Warburton (born 1962), British philosopher, lecturer at the Open University

P
 Patrick Warburton (born 1964), American actor
 Peter Warburton (1813–1889), explorer of Australia; brother of Rowland Egerton-Warburton
 Peter Warburton (footballer) (born 1951), Australian rules footballer
 Peter Warburton (judge) (c.1540–1621), English judge
 Piers Egerton-Warburton  (1839–1914), English politician

R
 Ralph Warburton (born 1924), American ice hockey player
 Ray Warburton (born 1967), English soccer player
 Richard Warburton (died 1610), English politician
 Sir Robert Warburton (1842–1899), Anglo-Indian soldier and administrator
 Rowland Egerton-Warburton (1804–1891), English landowner and benefactor; brother of Peter Warburton

S
 Sam Warburton (born 1988), Welsh rugby union player
 Stanton Warburton (1865–1926), American politician

T
 Thomas Warburton (born 1918), Finnish writer
 Thomas Warburton (born 1968), also "Mr. Warburton", American animator and producer
 Tony Warburton, member of English thrash/death metal band Cerebral Fix

W
 Wendy Warburton (born 1976), American politician
 William Warburton (1698–1779), English Anglican bishop and Shakespearean critic

Also 
 Warburton baronets of Arley, Cheshire
 Warburton family of  Philadelphia

English-language surnames
Lists of people by surname